Weapons training may refer to:

Firearm-related education
Firearm history
Firearm types
Range shooting
Sport shooting
Gun safety
Martial arts
Kata
Military exercises
Recruit training
Tactical engagement simulations
Weapon effects simulations
Military war gaming
MilSim sports
Laser tag gaming
Paintball gaming
"Weapons Training", a 1970 poem by Bruce Dawe

See also
Training weapon (disambiguation)